The Baranof Cross-Island Trail is an informal route across Baranof Island, Alaska from the community of Sitka to Baranof Warm Springs. The only section with a trail is from Medvejie to Camp Lake at 1,600'. The route is popular among resident Sitkans, but also attracts visiting backpackers. Very-fit distance runners, however, can complete the trail in a day, the record being held by Sitka resident and ultra-endurance athlete Steve Reifenstuhl who has completed the trail in seven and a half hours.

Route
The usual direction of passage is west to east, or Sitka to Baranof Warm Springs.  Since Baranof Warm Springs has no permanent transportation options inbound or outbound, backpackers must either turn around and hike back to Sitka, or arrange float plane or boat transportation.

The route begins at Medvejie Hatchery, accessible by boat or by hiking from Herring Cove on the  private road to Medvejie Hatchery. The route begins in the Medvejie Lake valley and continues up to Camp Lake, a popular campsite due to the scenic views, abundant water for bathing and drinking, and a comfortable alpine meadow for camping. The route climbs up Mount Bassie and crosses its western face and a small but crevasse-ridden icefield. Especially in the late summer, when snow bridges have melted and blue ice is prevalent, this portion of the route can be the most dangerous and difficult part of the trip. An orbicular ridge leads north after Mount Bassie, splitting the Blue Lake watershed on the western side of the island from the Baranof River watershed on the eastern side of the island. The geology of the ridge (which also features basalt dikes) offers many locations to make camp with access to small pools for drinking water.

The ridge descends to two separate roughly mile-long icefields.  These icefields are flat with a small rocky isthmus separating them (it is marked as one icefield on USGS maps, however the icefield has since receded into two separate icefields).  After the icefields, the route passes several alpine lakes and descends down to Baranof Lake through a mix of temperate rainforest and cliffs.  An informal trail leads from Baranof Lake to the boardwalk of Baranof Warm Springs.

Alternate route
An alternate route terminates on the southern side of Warm Springs Bay.  It has increased opportunities for skiing in the winter.  This route shares no common segments with the traditional route.

This route begins with the approach to Peak 5390 and continues down past Mount Furuhelm and down to Warm Springs Bay.  Once at Warm Springs Bay, a pick-up to shuttle is required to cross the bay to Baranof Warm Springs.

Safety
In the past ten years three separate parties have had to be rescued by the United States Coast Guard, including one near-death incident. The primary causes for complications on the trail are poor weather, poor decision-making after bad weather sets in, lack of equipment, and poor physical fitness.

Local guides are available informally. There are currently no commercial guides, although such a venture has been planned in the past.

Equipment
Standard backpacking gear is required for a crossing, but also gear that accounts for alpine campsites exposed to high winds and severe weather elements. Ice axes and crampons are useful for traversing ice. Climbing rope, with or without harnesses, is suggested in case of exposure to crevasses.

External links
Anchorage Daily News overview of rescue

Hiking trails in Alaska
Protected areas of Sitka, Alaska